Khay Sett Thwin (born Phyo Phyo Ei on 21 March 1991) is a Burmese television and film actress. She is best known for her roles in several MRTV-4 series and became popular among the audiences with the series A Yake (2018) and Rose (2019).

Early life and education
Khay Sett Thwin was on March 21, 1991 in Mandalay, Myanmar. She graduated with a degree B.A English from West Yangon University.

Career
She started her career from attending at Talents & Models Agency in 2011. She competed in Miss Beautiful Footstep 2011 and won 2nd Runner-up. She also competed in Miss People 2011 and won Best Smile Award.

In 2013, she starred in her debut comedy-drama series Flowers & Butterflies as the character Thadar alongside Kyi Zaw Htet, Kyaw Hsu, Nat Khat and Soe Nandar Kyaw. In the same year, she starred in comedy series Happy Beach alongside Kyi Zaw Htet, Kyaw Hsu, Min Tharke, Mone, Wint Yamone Naing, Myat Thu Thu and Zu Zu Zan. In 2015, she starred in comedy-drama series Eain Nee Chin alongside Kaung Myat San. 

In 2017, she starred in drama series Sone See Chin Moe Tain Myar alongside Si Thu Win and May Myint Mo. In the same year, she starred in drama series Oo Yin Mhu Phit Phu Chin The alongside Kyaw Hsu, Hein Htet and Poe Kyar Phyu Khin. In 2018, she starred in drama series A Yake as the character A Mar Nyo alongside Nat Khat, May Myint Mo, Hein Htet (actor) and Nan Sandar Hla Htun. In the same year, she starred in comedy series Thermometer alongside Phone Set Thwin and So Pyay Myint.

In 2019, she starred in comedy series Lay Sone Twal alongside Phone Set Thwin, So Pyay Myint and Khant Thiri Zaw. In the same year, she starred in drama series Hnin Si as the character Hnin alongside Ye Aung and Si Thu Win.

Political activities

Following the 2021 Myanmar coup d'état, she participated in the anti-coup movement both in person at rallies and through social media. Denouncing the military coup, she took part in protests, starting in February. She joined the "We Want Justice" three-finger salute movement. The movement was launched on social media, and many celebrities have joined the movement.

On 15 April 2021, warrants for her arrest were issued under Section 505 (a) of the penal code by the State Administration Council for speaking out against the military coup. Along with several other celebrities, she was charged with calling for participation in the Civil Disobedience Movement (CDM) and damaging the state's ability to govern, with supporting the Committee Representing Pyidaungsu Hluttaw, and with generally inciting the people to disturb the peace and stability of the nation.

Filmography

Film (Cinema)
Kan (2020)
Tha Ti Lu Kuu Myin Kyar Mha Kuu Par (2020)

Television series
 Flowers & Butterflies (2013)
 Happy Beach (2013)
 Eain Nee Chin (2015)
 Sone See Chin Moe Tain Myar (2017)
 Oo Yin Mhu Phit Phu Chin The (2017)
 A Yake (2018)
 Thermometer (2018)
 Lay Sone Twal (2019)
 Rose (2019)
Nga Na Mal Ta Khar Yut Taing Poe Soe Pat Sat Khan Sar Say Ya Mal (2022)
Chit Mi Tot Lae Zoot (2023)

References

External links

Living people
1991 births
21st-century Burmese actresses
People from Mandalay